The Actopan River is a river of Mexico that reaches the Gulf of Mexico in the state of Veracruz.

See also
List of rivers of Mexico

References
"River Basins", Atlas of Mexico, 1975, topographical map.
The Prentice Hall American World Atlas, 1984.
The New International Atlas, Rand McNally, 1993.

Rivers of Veracruz
Drainage basins of the Gulf of Mexico